Levy is an unincorporated community in Washington County, in the U.S. state of Missouri.

History
A post office called Levy was established in 1889, and remained in operation until 1908. The identity of the namesake of Levy has been forgotten.

References

Unincorporated communities in Washington County, Missouri
Unincorporated communities in Missouri